The 1900 United States presidential election in Colorado took place on November 6, 1900. All contemporary 45 states were part of the 1900 United States presidential election. Colorado voters chose four electors to the Electoral College, which selected the president and vice president.

Background
In its early days as a state, Colorado had, like the Plains States to its east, been solidly Republican. However, with crises emerging in its agricultural sector from low wheat prices and a severe drought in 1888 and 1889, and the state’s underdevelopment leading to resentment of the Northeast, the new Populist Party was able to largely take over the state’s politics in the early 1890s. Aided by fusion with the minority Democratic Party and strong support for free silver in this state which produced over half of all American silver, the Populist Party under James B. Weaver in 1892 carried the state’s presidential electoral votes and won both its congressional seats. After the Republicans gained a 130-seat majority in the House of Representatives following the 1894 elections, five dissident Republicans from the Mountain States who supported free silver jointed together as the “Silver Republicans” They supported nominating Centennial State Senator Teller at first, but ultimately this was viewed as impractical and the Silver Republicans fused with Democrat/Populist William Jennings Bryan, who won Colorado by six-and-a-half-to-one over William McKinley.

Following the election, the Populist majority in Colorado largely faded after the ensuing return to prosperity. However, Colorado and other Mountain States became opposed to the Philippine–American War, which they viewed as an imperialist land grab, which maintained substantial support for Bryan although free silver had largely disappeared as an important issue except within the silver-mining industry.

Vote
One week before the election, the GOP had given up trying to carry Colorado, and ultimately Bryan won the state by 13.39 percentage points, which was nonetheless only two-elevenths of his 1896 margin. Bryan had previously won Colorado against William McKinley four years earlier and would later also win the state against William Howard Taft in 1908. Since Colorado's statehood, this marks the only time that a Republican president won another term in office without winning Colorado. Meanwhile Democratic presidents have done so in 1892, 1940, 1944, and 1996.

Results

Results by county

Notes

References

Colorado
1900
1900 Colorado elections